Rob Rankin (born April 27, 1982) is an American former professional ice hockey player who during his career played in the American Hockey League, the ECHL, and the British Elite Ice Hockey League.

He represented the Pensacola Ice Pilots in the 2007 ECHL All-Star Game held at Qwest Arena in Boise, Idaho.

Career statistics

References

External links

1982 births
American men's ice hockey forwards
Bridgeport Sound Tigers players
Hull Stingrays players
Ice hockey players from Minnesota
Living people
Michigan Tech Huskies men's ice hockey players
Minnesota State Mavericks men's ice hockey players
Newcastle Vipers players
Pensacola Ice Pilots players
Rochester Mustangs players
Topeka Scarecrows players

Minnesota State University, Mankato alumni